Qalhat LNG Terminal, also known as Port of Qalhat, is situated in Ash Sharqiyah Region of Oman near Sur.

This port is owned by Oman LNG LLC S.A.O.C.. Osaka Gas has a 3% equity interests in Qalhat LNG along with Itochu Corporation and Mitsubishi Corporation. These three Japanese companies have a 9% stake in total and have entered into multi-year LNG supply agreements with Oman. The other shareholders in Qalhat LNG are the Oman Government (46.84%), Oman LNG (36.8%) and Spanish utility Unión Fenosa Gas (7.36%).

References

External links
 Website Oman LNG

Transport in Oman
Ports and harbours of Oman